Juan José "Juanjo" Bezares Alarcón (born 17 May 1981) is a Spanish former footballer who played as a defensive midfielder.

Football career
Born in Guadiaro, Province of Cádiz, Bezares started his career with Real Balompédica Linense, playing his first four seasons as a senior in Segunda División B, where he also represented Sevilla FC's reserves. On 1 February 2004, with the latter, he made his first-team – and La Liga – debut, fracturing his nose in a 0–1 away loss against Deportivo de La Coruña.

In the 2004 summer, Bezares joined Cádiz CF in Segunda División, being promoted in his first season but suffering relegation in his second. In the 2007–08 campaign he again dropped down a level, but contributed with 15 matches to the 2009 promotion (only one start, however, in 232 minutes of action).

Bezares moved abroad in January 2009, being loaned to Superleague Greece club OFI Crete FC. In August, he signed with Unión Estepona CF in the same situation but, in January 2010, he terminated his contract and joined AEP Paphos FC in the Cypriot First Division; one year later he changed teams and countries again, signing with FC Aktobe in Kazakhstan.

In January 2012, Bezares returned to Spain and joined Segunda B club CF Villanovense. On 21 July, after undergoing a successful trial, he signed with another third-tier side, Gimnàstic de Tarragona, leaving on 29 June of the following year after an agreement with the club for the extension of his contract was not reached.

References

External links

Stats and bio at Cadistas1910 
Stats at El Mundo 

1981 births
Living people
Footballers from San Roque, Cádiz
Spanish footballers
Association football midfielders
La Liga players
Segunda División players
Segunda División B players
Tercera División players
Real Balompédica Linense footballers
Sevilla Atlético players
Sevilla FC players
Cádiz CF players
CF Villanovense players
Gimnàstic de Tarragona footballers
CD Eldense footballers
Super League Greece players
OFI Crete F.C. players
Cypriot First Division players
AEP Paphos FC players
Kazakhstan Premier League players
FC Aktobe players
Gibraltar Premier Division players
Europa F.C. players
Spanish expatriate footballers
Expatriate footballers in Greece
Expatriate footballers in Cyprus
Expatriate footballers in Kazakhstan
Expatriate footballers in Gibraltar
Spanish expatriate sportspeople in Greece
Spanish expatriate sportspeople in Cyprus
Spanish expatriate sportspeople in Gibraltar
Spanish expatriate sportspeople in Kazakhstan